Mahlia the Mestiza (French: Mahlia la métisse) is a 1943 French drama film directed by Walter Kapps and starring Käthe von Nagy, Jean Servais and Georges Paulais. The film had a lengthy and troubled production, as it began shooting in 1939 before the outbreak of the Second World War.

Cast
 Käthe von Nagy as Mahlia - a mixed race woman adopted by a French couple
 Jean Servais as Henri de Roussière - the son of Mahlia's adoptive parents
 Georges Paulais as Mahlia's father  
 Catherine Fonteney as Madame de Roussière - Mahlia's adoptive mother  
 Pierre Magnier as Le docteur Moreuil (Dr. Moreuil)
 Ky Duyen as Sao  
 Roger Karl as Tchang - a rich and sleezy man who covets Mahlia 
 Brigitte Bargès 
 Jacques Baumer 
 Pierre Labry 
 Philina Loquez 
 France Mooréa 
 Olga Pauletti 
 Georges Péclet 
 Janine Viénot

References

Bibliography 
 Hans-Michael Bock and Tim Bergfelder. The Concise Cinegraph: An Encyclopedia of German Cinema. Berghahn Books.

External links 
 

1943 films
French drama films
1943 drama films
1940s French-language films
French black-and-white films
Films directed by Walter Kapps
1940s French films